Odyssey is the second internationally published album by Hayley Westenra. Her other previous albums, with the exception of Pure, were released only in New Zealand and Australia. It was published by the Decca Music Group label in 2005.

Odyssey included a duet with Andrea Bocelli called "Dell'Amore Non Si Sa", a gospel song "I Say Grace", an inspired cover of Joni Mitchell's "Both Sides, Now", "May it Be" – a song from The Lord of the Rings, as well as a cover of the song "What You Never Know (Won't Hurt You)" from the Sarah Brightman album Harem.

Odyssey debuted at number one on the New Zealand Album Chart, being certified platinum in its first week of release.

Track listing

International version
This excludes the US, UK and Japanese versions.
 "Prayer"
 "Never Saw Blue"
 "Dell'amore non si sa" (with Andrea Bocelli)
 "Ave Maria (Caccini)"
 "Both Sides, Now"
 "What You Never Know (Won't Hurt You)"
 "May It Be"
 "Quanta Qualia"
 "Bachianas Brasileiras No 5 Aria (Cantilena)"
 "She Moves Through the Fair"
 "I Say Grace"
 "My Heart Belongs to You"

New Zealand special edition bonus disc
 Bridal Ballad
 O mio babbino caro
 Laudate Dominum
 Wiegenlied
 Ave Maria (Bach) (English Lyrics)
 The Mists of Islay

Japanese version
 Prayer
 Never Saw Blue
 "Dell'amore non si sa" (with Andrea Bocelli)
 Ave Maria
 Both Sides Now
 What You Never Know (Won't Hurt You)
 May It Be
 Quanta Qualia
 Bachianas Brasileiras No. 5 Aria (Cantilena)
 She Moves Through the Fair
 I Say Grace
 My Heart Belongs to You
 Bridal Ballad From The Merchant of Venice
 The Mummers Dance
 Wiegenlied (From Lorelei)

United Kingdom version
There were two different versions of the UK album released. The first was released on 26 September 2005 and the second was released on 10 April 2006.
First version

Second version
 May It Be
 The Water Is Wide
 Dell'amore non si sa
 Lascia ch'io pianga
 Prayer
 Ave Maria
 Scarborough Fair
 Quanta Qualia
 O mio babbino caro
 What You Never Know (Won't Hurt You)
 Both Sides, Now
 Mists of Islay
 Laudate Dominum
 She Moves Through The Fair

US Version
 Prayer – 4:21
 Both Sides, Now – 3:43
 Never Saw Blue [Full Length Drums Mix] – 4:37
 Dell'amore non si sa – 3:45
 What You Never Know (Won't Hurt You) [Sunrise Mix] – 3:43
 May It Be – 3:39
 Quanta Qualia – 4:25
 You Are Water – 4:03
 She Moves Through the Fair – 4:35
 My Heart Belongs to You [US Mix] – 4:41
 Ave Maria – 3:44
 I Say Grace – 5:06

iTunes exclusive EP tracks
 "Mary, Did You Know?" (Orchestral Version) – 3:29
 Vesperae solennes de confessore, K. 339 (Mozart): "Laudate Dominum" – 4:27
 Gianni Schicchi: "O mio babbino caro" – 2:32
 Dido and Aeneas: "Dido's Lament" ("When I am laid in earth") – 3:43

Charts

Certifications

References

2005 albums
Hayley Westenra albums